The 2015–16 SIU Edwardsville Cougars men's basketball team represented Southern Illinois University Edwardsville during the 2015–16 NCAA Division I men's basketball season. The Cougars, led by first year head coach Jon Harris, played their home games at the Vadalabene Center as members of the West Division of the Ohio Valley Conference (OVC). They finished the season 6–22, 3–13 in OVC play to finish in fifth place in the west division. They failed to qualify for the OVC tournament.

Off-season
A nationwide search for a new head coach began in March, 2015, and on April 3, Edwardsville native Jon Harris, an assistant coach for the California Golden Bears was introduced as the new Cougars head coach. Harris announced the addition of assistant coaches Kent Williams and Tarrence Crump on April 24. On May 28, Charles "Bubba" Wells was also added to the staff.

Preseason
Six players, all of whom saw major playing time, return from the 12–16 team of 2014–15. One recruit from high school signed by previous coach Lennox Forrester joined the team in addition to others recruited by new coach Harris and his staff, including three transfers from Southern Illinois junior colleges (one from local Lewis & Clark), a transferring graduate student with remaining eligibility, and a transfer who will be eligible after the semester break. Missing from the mix is Donovine Stewart, last season's leader in minutes played, assists, and steals and #2 in scoring and rebounding, who graduated with a year of eligibility remaining and was said to have been contacted about transferring by Illinois, Minnesota, USC, and others, with Illinois having requested his transcripts; Stewart eventually transferred to Portland State but sat out the PSU @ SIUE game on December 12.

Season
The 2015–16 season will begin in mid-November, 2015.

Although the final schedule was not released until August 2, SIUE's non-conference opponents for the upcoming campaign were announced in May. The Cougars will host Saint Louis (11–21 in 2014-15), Portland State (15–14), Campbell (10–22), and Grand Canyon (17–15) at the Vadalabene Center. They will take road trips  to play at  USC (12–20), Butler (23–11), Northwestern (15–17), SIU Carbondale (12–21), Milwaukee (14–16), and IPFW (16–15).

Most games will be streamed online. Fox Sports Midwest will carry a package of SIUE games for the fourth consecutive season. Fox's broadcast/cablecasts of Cougars games began with five games in the  2012-2013 season, increasing to eight games in 2013-14 and nine games last season. The OVC is also has conference cablecast packages with American Sports Network and CBS Sports Network that will include Cougar games.

Postseason
The Ohio Valley Conference men's and women's basketball tournaments will again return to Nashville, Tennessee and the Nashville Municipal Auditorium on March 2–5, 2016.

The 2016 NCAA Men's Division I Basketball Tournament is scheduled to begin on March 15, 2016, and will conclude with the championship game on April 4 at NRG Stadium in Houston, Texas.

Roster

Schedule
Source: 

|-
!colspan=8 style="background:#CC0000; color:black;"| Exhibition

|-
!colspan=8 style="background:#CC0000; color:black;"| Regular season

|-

|-

|-

|-

|-

|-

|-

|-

|-

|-

|-

|-

|-

|-

|-

|-

|-

|-

|-

|-

|-

|-

|-

|-

|-

|-

|-

References 

SIU Edwardsville
SIU Edwardsville Cougars men's basketball seasons
Edward
Edward